Co-construction may refer to:
Co-construction (linguistics), a grammatical or semantic entity which has been uttered by more than one speaker

Co-construction (learning), a distinctive approach to learning, where the emphasis is on collaborative, or partnership working